Boubacar "Copa" Barry (born 30 December 1979) is an Ivorian former professional footballer who played as a goalkeeper. Having begun his career at ASEC Mimosas, he moved to France in 2001, where he played for Rennes' reserve team. In 2003, he joined Belgian side Beveren where he stayed four years. He then spent ten years at K.S.C. Lokeren Oost-Vlaanderen amassing 239 league appearances. At international level, he represented the Ivory Coast national team before his retirement from international football in March 2015, but continued to play for his club, Lokeren. Exactly four years after his international retirement, Barry retired also professionally as a player in March 2019.

Club career
Barry scored a penalty for Lokeren in the 2011–12 season, in a 4–0 win against Westerlo. He won the Belgian Cup with Lokeren in the same season as well as in the 2013–14 season.

When his contract at Lokeren ran out, he was signed by Belgian First Division B team Oud-Heverlee Leuven, where he was part of the squad during the 2017–18 and 2018–19 season as backup goalkeeper, but was effectively employed as goalkeeping coach.

He retired from playing on 2 March 2019, although at that point in time he had not played a match for over two years.

International career
Barry was called up to the 2006 World Cup as part of the Ivory Coast national team. He appeared in the final group match against Serbia and Montenegro on 22 June 2006, which Ivory Coast won 3–2.

He started all three matches for the Ivory Coast in Group G in the 2010 FIFA World Cup. He earned clean sheets against Portugal and North Korea.

He was the first-choice goalkeeper for the Elephants' 2014 FIFA World Cup campaign as they narrowly missed out on qualifying for the second round, following an injury-time defeat to Greece.

2015 Africa Cup of Nations
Barry was called up to the Ivory Coast squad for the 2015 Africa Cup of Nations held in Equatorial Guinea. He was benched for most of the tournament in favour of his younger teammate Sylvain Gbohouo, but went on to play in the final following Gbohouo's injury in the semi-final. It was his second appearance in the showpiece event having been in goal in the 2012 final against Zambia; a match that the Ivory Coast lost 7–8 on penalties after the game finished 0–0. The 2015 final finished goalless after normal and extra-time, and Barry emerged as the hero by saving two penalties and scoring the winning penalty, overcoming a cramp in the process.

A month later, on 2 March 2015, he retired from international football.

Career statistics

Club

International

Honours
Lokeren
 Belgian Cup: 2011–12, 2013–14

Ivory Coast
 Africa Cup of Nations: 2015

Individual
 Belgian Goalkeeper of the Year: 2008–09

References

External links

Profile and stats - Lokeren

1979 births
Living people
Footballers from Abidjan
Ivorian people of Guinean descent
Ivorian expatriate sportspeople in Belgium
Association football goalkeepers
Ivorian footballers
Ivorian expatriate footballers
Ivory Coast international footballers
Expatriate footballers in France
Expatriate footballers in Belgium
Belgian Pro League players
Challenger Pro League players
Ligue 1 players
ASEC Mimosas players
Stade Rennais F.C. players
K.S.K. Beveren players
K.S.C. Lokeren Oost-Vlaanderen players
Oud-Heverlee Leuven players
2002 African Cup of Nations players
2006 FIFA World Cup players
2006 Africa Cup of Nations players
2008 Africa Cup of Nations players
2010 Africa Cup of Nations players
2010 FIFA World Cup players
2012 Africa Cup of Nations players
2013 Africa Cup of Nations players
2014 FIFA World Cup players
2015 Africa Cup of Nations players
Africa Cup of Nations-winning players
Oud-Heverlee Leuven non-playing staff
Ivorian football managers
Association football goalkeeping coaches